Diplochaetus is a genus of ground beetles in the family Carabidae. There are at least four described species in Diplochaetus.

Species
These four species belong to the genus Diplochaetus:
 Diplochaetus emaciatus (Bates, 1891)  (Central America and North America)
 Diplochaetus megacephalus Bousquet & Laplante, 1997  (North America)
 Diplochaetus planatus (G.Horn, 1876)  (North America)
 Diplochaetus rutilus (Chevrolat, 1863)  (North, Central, and South America)

References

Trechinae